Goji was a location-based virtual keyboard, created for iOS 8 by The Last Guide Company. The keyboard enabled users to output recommendations for  places of interest around them by tapping on an icon. The keyboard was released in October 2014 and removed from the iOS App Store when the company was closed in August 2015.

Goji would display a dynamic gradient background based on the current time of day and emoji icons related to the mobile device's current location and city. For example, when on Apple Campus, Apple specific icons would be shown.

References

External links

Goji keyboard demo video
Goji installation video
Goji Capptivate.co overview
Goji keyboard walkthrough

Input/output
IOS software
Mobile technology
Virtual keyboards